Faye Hammill FRSE is a professor in the University of Glasgow, specialising in North American and British modern writing in the first half of the twentieth century, what is often called 'middlebrow'. Her recent focus is ocean liners in literature. She is a Fellow of the Royal Society of Edinburgh (2021).

Education and career 
Hammill graduated with a First Class degree in English Language & Literature with French from the University of Birmingham (1995) and completed her doctorate four years later in Canadian Literature. She lectured in English for three years at Cardiff University and then spent five years at Liverpool University, becoming senior lecturer in 2006. Moving to Glasgow, Hammill taught English at Strathclyde University for six years, becoming professor in 2011, and part-time Deputy Associate Principal (Research) in 2016.

Since 2017, she has been professor in English Literature in the School of Critical Studies at the University of Glasgow, and has served on research assessment and peer review groups, as keynote speakers at conferences and published books and other academic research.

Research and publications 
Her comparative literature research covered well known publications, such as Cold Comfort Farm, and Anne of Green Gables, the 1934 film version of the latter she said glossed over the character's 'loss, rejection, cruel authority figures, and loneliness', and that the character of Anne Shirley had 'overshadowed' that of her creator.'  Hammill  also said of the 'Great American Novel' contender, Gentlemen Prefer Blondes, was one of the few that 'doesn't stink'. One of her areas of interest in 2002, whilst at Cardiff, was also Canadian literary reviews considering the idea of nature and the 'Gothic'.  In 2007, when Hammill was at Strathclyde, she wrote about her research examining literary women and writing between the wars, and the notion of celebrity.

She began the AHRC Middlebrow Network in 2008, which has grown to 400 members. Her international collaboration on Canadian magazines and writing on travel, also grew with a joint project with the Canadian Writing Research Group in 2011, and a book titled Magazines, Travel and Middlebrow Culture published with Michelle Smith, in 2015.  Her work studying middlebrow culture looked further at the impact of publications like Vanity Fair (1914–36); American Mercury (1924–81); New Yorker (1925– ); Esquire (1933– ) in a chapter written with Karen Leick in Oxford University Press publication Modernism and the Quality Magazines.  The Canadian Social Sciences and Humanities Research Council, in 2015, funded a 'Modern Magazines project' with Hammill, Hannah McGregor and Paul Hjartarson, publishing their key findings in the Canadian academic journal English Studies in Canada. The previous year she had given a keynote lecture for ACCUTE at the Congress of the Humanities and Social Sciences (Brock University, Canada).

Hammill won a mid-career Fellowship from the British Academy (2015) on Noël Coward and attitudes to print culture or popularity. In 2018, she gave a keynote lecture at the  "Big Magazines" conference (Aix-Marseille Université, France) In 2019, the University of Glasgow awarded her a Research Culture Award, for her work in mentoring and supporting early career researchers.

Ocean liners and literature 
Hammill's most recent focus has been on the role of ocean liners in modern literature. She has been asked to speak at conferences and events across the country, and internationally. For example, in 2018 at the V&A Museum Ocean Liners Conference; at Nottingham Trent University Periodicals and Print Culture Research Group (2020); at a Kings College London 2020 event titled The Frantic Atlantic: Ocean Liners in the Interwar Literary Imagination; invited as keynote speaker on 'A business man's dream': Promoting/Narrating the RMS Queen Mary at the International Postgraduate Port and Maritime Studies Network Belfast conference (2020); and in considering Transatlantic Style: The Ocean Liner and the 'International Set  in the second USA Transatlantic Literary Women's series (online 2020).

Hammill has also contributed to telephones in literature (online exhibition) and an English PEN  International Women's Day event The Right to Roam: Women and Free Expression.

Other selected publications 

 Literary Culture and Female Authorship in Canada 1760-2000 (2003),   - see Awards
co-editor: Encyclopedia of British Women's Writing, 1900-1950 (2006)
Sophistication: A Literary and Cultural History (2010) described as 'smart and capacious'  - see Awards
Symbiosis: Transatlantic Literary and Cultural Relations (2020) - with Mark Hussey 
co-editor of the Palgrave series: Modern Materialisms
editor, new edition Margaret Kennedy's 1941 Where Stands a Wingèd Sentry (2021) 
editor, new edition Martha Ostenso's 1928 The Young May Moon (due 2021, Borealis Press) Carnegie Trust Research Incentive Grant

Current research publications 
These are published by the University of Glasgow.

Awards 
 2003 - for Literary Culture and Female Authorship in Canada, the International Council for Canadian Studies' Pierre Savard Award.  
 2010 - for Sophistication: A Literary and Cultural History  European Society for the Study of English (ESSE)'s biannual book prize in English Literature  
 2011 - Young Academy of Scotland 
 2021 - Fellow of the Royal Society of Edinburgh

See also 
 Stella Gibbons : Cold Comfort Farm
 Lucy Maud Montgomery : Anne of Green Gables ; Anne Shirley 
Great American Novel

References 

British women academics
Fellows of the Royal Society of Edinburgh
Year of birth missing (living people)
Living people